James Clifford was the member of Parliament for the constituency of Gloucestershire for the parliament of October 1404.

References 

Members of the Parliament of England for Gloucestershire
English MPs October 1404
Year of birth unknown
Year of death unknown